Acantholipes zuboides is a species of moth in the family Erebidae. It is found in Australia, where it has been recorded from the Montebello Islands.

References

zuboides
Moths described in 1914
Moths of Australia